Sycamore Branch is a stream in Bates County in the U.S. state of Missouri. It is a tributary of the Marais des Cygnes River.
The source area for the stream is at an elevation of about 875 feet and the confluence is at 738 feet.

The stream crosses under Missouri routes B and N prior to entering the floodplain. Rich Hill lies five miles to the west on Route B.  Mission Branch joins the stream within the floodplain of the Marais des Cygnes River.

Sycamore Branch was named for the sycamore trees lining its banks.

See also
List of rivers of Missouri

References

Rivers of Bates County, Missouri
Rivers of Missouri